The 44° Targa Florio took place on 8 May 1960, on the Circuito Piccolo delle Madonie, (Sicily, Italy).  It was the third round of the F.I.A. World Sports Car Championship.

Report

Entry

The event attracted more cars than in previous seasons, with 78 racing cars were registered for this event, instead of the 58 in 1959, of which 77 arrived for practice. Only these, 69 qualified for, and started the race.

Reigning World Champions, Ferrari had entered three of their latest 250 TR 60 and Dino 246 S for their squad of drivers; Phil Hill, Wolfgang von Trips, Richie Ginther, Willy Mairesse, Ludovico Scarfiotti and Cliff Allison. As Aston Martin elected to miss the championship in concentrate on Formula One, there was no other factory entrants in the S3.0 class, therefore their main opposition would come from the works Porsches of Jo Bonnier, Hans Herrmann, Edgar Barth, Graham Hill and Olivier Gendebien, despite these were smaller engined cars and less powerful, the marque was victorious twelve months earlier and in the last round, 12 Hours of Sebring.

Race

Even before the race started, Ferrari had a frightening accident where Allisons’s 250 TR suffered a blown tyre, and was withdrawn from the event.

At the start, the remaining three Scuderia Ferrari’s in the Sport category were the favourites. The cars of the Rodríguez brothers and that of Hill and von Trips, who were supposed to attack. Once von Trips has moved into the lead, it was decided they should continue to race flat-out, and not back off, to try and maintenance their advantage. In the fight for the victory, the Porsche of Bonnier/Herrmann moved ahead of the Ferraris, however it was the all Italian crew of Umberto Maglioli and Nino Vaccarella in their Maserati Tipo 61 who were on a charge. On lap five, Maglioli passed Hermann, only to ceded the leadership to Palermo-born Vaccarella who betrayed his audience: everyone looked at him with his breath a bit 'suspended, it did not seem possible; Nino completed the sixth lap slightly increasing the advantage of Hermann; the seventh his Maserati, the number 200, it did make the fastest lap and was passing with a lead over three minutes. On the seventh lap, Maglioli waiting for him to finish the race brilliantly, but did not reach Vaccarella: a stone had punctured the fuel tank.

The Porsche of Bonnier/Herrmann inherited the lead, to record their second straight win in Sicily, and their second consecutive win in the World Sportscar Champions. They took the victory, with their 718 RS 60 completing 10 laps, covering 447.388 miles in just over 7½ hours of racing, averaging a speed of 59.239 mph. Second place went to the works Ferrari of von Trips and Hill in a Dino 246 S, albeit over 6 mins adrift. The podium was complete by another works Porsche, of Olivier Gendebien and Herrmann who were further 2½ mins behind.

Official Classification

Class Winners are in Bold text.

 Fastest Lap: Jo Bonnier, 42:46.0secs (62.767 mph)

Class Winners

Standings after the race

Note: Only the top five positions are included in this set of standings.

Championship points were awarded for the first six places in each race in the order of 8-6-4-3-2-1. Manufacturers were only awarded points for their highest finishing car with no points awarded for positions filled by additional cars. Only the best 3 results out of the 5 races could be retained by each manufacturer. Points earned but not counted towards the championship totals are listed within brackets in the above table.

References

Further reading

Ed Heivink. Targa Florio: 1955-1973. Reinhard Klein.  

Targa Florio
Targa Florio
Targa Florio